Robert or Robbie Glover may refer to:

Robert Glover (martyr) (died 1555), English Protestant martyr burnt to death for heresy
Robert Glover (officer of arms) (1544–1588), Somerset Herald in the reign of Elizabeth I
Robert Glover (pirate) (died 1698), pirate captain active in the Red Sea
Robert E. Glover (1896–1984), American engineer
Robert W. Glover (1866–1956), Baptist pastor and politician in Arkansas
Robert Mortimer Glover (1815–1859), British physician
Robbie Glover (singer), UK singer/songwriter
Robbie Glover, character in Dirk Gently, played by Tony Pitts
Robert A. Glover, American writer of self-help book No More Mr. Nice Guy